Piedrahita de Muñó is a Spanish town in the province of Burgos, Old Castile; an autonomous community of Castilla y León in the region of Sierra de la Demanda, judicial district of Salas.

Sources
Larruga, Eugenio. Memorias Políticas y Económicas.... 1794, v. 30, p. 159  
Arzobispado de Burgos Información beatos 2007 
Los Mártires Beatificados y Canonizados por el Papa Juan Pablo II. Una Reflexión Española

Municipalities in the Province of Burgos